Quanto Mais Vida, Melhor! (English title: A Life to Die For) is a Brazilian telenovela produced and broadcast by TV Globo. It aired from 22 November 2021 to 27 May 2022. The telenovela is written by Mauro Wilson, with the collaboration of Marcelo Gonçalves, Mariana Torres, and Rodrigo Salomão. It stars Giovanna Antonelli, Vladimir Brichta, Mateus Solano, and Valentina Herszage.

The series revolves around four different people who, after going through the experience of facing Death together, are given a second chance at life.

Plot 
After dying in a plane crash, Neném, Paula, Guilherme, and Flávia are given a second chance at life by Death under one condition: they have to fix their lives and that one of them will definitively die in one year. Paula (Giovanna Antonelli) is a fashionista businesswoman who owns a cosmetics company, and has a bad relationship with her daughter, Ingrid, because of her introspective way of life. She is at war in business with Carmem, owner of a competitor company, who schemes to destroy her with the help of her lover Marcelo, who seduces Paula to spy on her. Neném (Vladimir Brichta) is a retired soccer player who lives with his mother, his two ex-wives, and the two daughters he had with each wife: Martina, who dreams of becoming a soccer player, and Bianca, who has an illness. Neném decides to gain his career back in order to pay for Bianca's treatment. Guilherme (Mateus Solano) is a successful surgeon who has dedicated his entire life to his job, forgetting about his family. He wants to save his failing marriage to Rose and his turbulent relationship with his son Antonio. Flávia (Valentina Herszage) a pole dancer who decides to change her life. She bonds with Paula, creating a mother-daughter relationship with her, much to the annoyance of Ingrid. She gets into complicated romances with Guilherme and Gabriel, Carmem's son, besides Murilo being attracted to her, causing the envy of Vanda and Ingrid, who are both in love with him.

Cast 

 Giovanna Antonelli as Paula Terrare / Eliete
 Giulia Costa as Young Eliete
 Vladimir Brichta as Luca Marino "Neném"
 Leonardo Zanchin as Young Neném
 João Bravo as Child Neném
 Mateus Solano as Guilherme Monteiro Bragança
 Nicolas Ahnert as Young Guilherme
 Valentina Herszage as Flávia Santana
 Bárbara Colen as Rose Costa Grava Monteiro Bragança
 Carol Macedo as Young Rose
 Júlia Lemmertz as Carmem Wollinger
 Evelyn Castro as Deusilene dos Santos "Deusa"
 Thardelly Lima as Odaílson Pafúncio Ferreira
 Luciana Paes as Odete
 Renata Benicá as Young Odete
 Fabio Herford as Juca
 Mariana Nunes as Dr. Joana Valadares
 Bruno Cabrerizo as Marcelo Pereira
 Felipe Abib as Ronildo Marino "Roni"
 José Victor Pires as Young Roni
 Fred Garcia as Child Roni
 Valentina Bandeira as Cora Maria de Aparecida
 Pedroca Monteiro as Deputy Prado
 Jussara Freire as Antônia "Tuninha"
 Zezeh Barbosa as Tetê
 Marcelo Flores as Waldemar Silva "Trombada"
 Nina Tomsic as Ingrid Terrare
 Ana Hikari as Vanda "Vandinha"
 Matheus Abreu as Antônio Costa Grava Monteiro Bragança "Tigrão"
 Karina Dohme as Maria Teresa Santos "Teca"
 Carol Garcia as Betina "Beta"
 Micheli Machado as Jandira
 Maíra Sá Ribeiro as Young Jandira
 Jaffar Bambirra as Murilo
 Caio Manhente as Gabriel Wollinger
 Cridemar Aquino as Deputy Nunes
 Sérgio Menezes as Chicão
 Tadeu Mello as Nilton Braga
 Camila Rocha as Soraia
 Fabrício Assis as Cabeça
 Diego Francisco as Denis
 Alessandro Brandão as Chefe
 Carol Marra as Alice Fernandes Junqueira Paiva
 João Fenerich as Dr. Soares
 Gabriel Sanches as Roberto Cintra "Bebeto"
 Maria Sílvia Radomille as Regina
 Séfora Rangel as Rute
 Alex Nader as Conrado Tavares
 Cândido Damm as Celso Terrare
 A Maia as Morte
 Agnes Brichta as Martina Marino "Tina" 
 Sara Vidal as Bianca Marino "Bibi"
 André Silberg as Leco
 Carlos Silberg as Neco
 Ana Lúcia Torre as Celina Monteiro Bragança 
 Tato Gabus Mendes as Daniel Monteiro Bragança 
 Marcos Caruso as Osvaldo
 Elizabeth Savalla as Nedda
 Bianca Joy Porte as Young Nedda
 Renato Livera as Arthur Gomes "Tucão"
 Stepan Nercessian as Edson
 Pierre Santos as Young Edson
 Akin Garragar as Lázaro
 Carlos Lopes as Carlinhos
 Osvaldo Baraúna as Marcão
 Ítallo Vilane as Jura
 Felipe Hintze as Deputy Torres

Guest stars 
 Nany People as Lourdes / Madame Lu
 Lucio Mauro Filho as Cardoso
 Débora Lamm as Simone Gonçalves
 Gillray Coutinho as Jairo
 Alex Escobar as himself
 Zico as himself
 Luciano Huck as himself
 Diogo Nogueira as Zé do Pasto
 Dejan Petković as himself
 Adílio as himself
 Donizete Pantera as himself
 Túlio Maravilha as himself
 Nunes as himself
 Galvão Bueno as himself

Production 
Originally, the telenovela was to be titled A Morte Pode Esperar (Death Can Wait), but due to the deaths caused by the COVID-19 pandemic, it was changed to Quanto Mais Vida, Melhor! (The More Life, the Better!). Filming began on 17 November 2020.

Ratings 

The first episode of Quanto Mais Vida, Melhor! on 22 November 2021 drew a rating of 21.7%, the worst debut for the 7 p.m. telenovela (novelas das sete) timeslot in 51 years since Pigmalião 70 premiered with a 20% rating on 2 March 1970. It was also the lowest pilot-episode rating in more than two years since the premiere of Verão 90 drew a rating of 23.6% on 29 January 2019.

References

External links 

2021 Brazilian television series debuts
2022 Brazilian television series endings
2021 telenovelas
2020s Brazilian television series
TV Globo telenovelas
Brazilian telenovelas
Portuguese-language telenovelas
Television series about personifications of death
Musical telenovelas
Fiction about body swapping
Organ transplantation in fiction